John of Isenburg-Grenzau (German: Johann V. von Isenburg-Grenzau) (c. 1507 – 18 February 1556, in Montabaur) was the Count of Isenburg-Grenzau from 1554 until 1556, and (as John IV) the Archbishop-Elector of Trier from 1547 until 1556.

John was the second son of Count Henry the Elder. His father only had the money to educate John and his brother Salentin, and they were both sent into the church. In 1547 he was elected the Archbishop of Trier. As archbishop, John reorganised the finances of the archdiocese, and worked to improve the standards of his father's lands. In 1554 John succeeded his brother Anthony as Count of Isenburg-Grenzau.

John spent much of his time in his Westerwald residence of Montabaur, where he died in 1556.

References

External links 
Johann V. von Isenburg in den Saarländischen Biografien 

1500s births
1556 deaths
Year of birth uncertain
House of Isenburg
John 05
16th-century Roman Catholic archbishops in the Holy Roman Empire